Neilton Meira Mestzk (born 17 February 1994), commonly known as Neilton, is a Brazilian professional footballer who plays as a forward for Guarani.

Career

Santos
Neilton joined Santos' youth setup in 2008, aged 14. He was the club's topscorer in 2013 Copa São Paulo de Júnior, along with Giva. After his performances, he was a possible target to Premier League club Chelsea.

On 20 March, Neilton was promoted to first team and was named the "new Neymar". He made his first-team debut on the following day, in the Campeonato Paulista game against Mirassol. He made his Série A debut on 29 May, providing an assist to Walter Montillo's goal of a 1-2 defeat against Botafogo.

On 5 June, Neilton scored his first professional goal, in a 1-3 defeat against Criciúma. On 13 July, he scored twice in a 4-1 home routing over Portuguesa.

Cruzeiro
On 5 June 2014 Neilton signed a four-year deal with Cruzeiro. On 25 July of the following year, after being rarely used, he was loaned to Botafogo until the end of the year.

On 16 December 2015, Neilton's loan was renewed for a further year.

São Paulo
On 22 December 2016, São Paulo FC signed for one year with Neilton. Hudson, in other hand, goes to opposite side. On 13 May 2017,after poor performances, Neilton was dismissed by club.

Career statistics

Honours
Cruzeiro
Campeonato Brasileiro Série A: 2014

Botafogo
Campeonato Brasileiro Série B: 2015

References

External links

1994 births
Living people
Brazilian footballers
Brazilian expatriate footballers
Association football forwards
Campeonato Brasileiro Série A players
Campeonato Brasileiro Série B players
UAE Pro League players
Santos FC players
Cruzeiro Esporte Clube players
Botafogo de Futebol e Regatas players
São Paulo FC players
Esporte Clube Vitória players
Sport Club Internacional players
Hatta Club players
Coritiba Foot Ball Club players
Sport Club do Recife players
Expatriate footballers in the United Arab Emirates
Brazilian expatriate sportspeople in the United Arab Emirates